John Conybeare (31 January 1692 – 13 July 1755) was Bishop of Bristol and one of the most notable theologians of the 18th century.

Conybeare was born at Pinhoe, where his father was vicar, and educated at Exeter Free School, Blundell's School and Exeter College, Oxford. He was elected a Probationary Fellow of Exeter College in 1710, took his B.A. degree in 1713 and was appointed a year later as Praelector in Philosophy.

On 27 May 1716 Conybeare was ordained as a priest by the Bishop of Winchester, Sir Jonathan Trelawney and took a curacy in Surrey. He returned to Oxford a year later and became a well known preacher.

His subsequent appointments included:

 Rector of St Clement's Church, Oxford, 1724
 Senior Proctor, Exeter College, Oxford, 1725
 Elected Rector of Exeter College, Oxford, 1730
 Dean of Christ Church, Oxford, 1733
 Bishop of Bristol, 1750

Conybeare was known for the publication of his book Calumny Refuted, an answer to the personal slander of Dr. Richard Newton.

Conybeare was the father of Dr William Conybeare, the well known rector of Bishopsgate, and grandfather to the Anglo-Saxon translator and poet John Josias Conybeare and the geologist William Conybeare. He is buried in Bristol Cathedral.

Bibliography
 A Defence of Revealed Religion Against the Exceptions of a Late Writer in His ntituled Christianity As Old As Creation, against Matthew Tindal, 1732
 Calumny Refuted: Or, An Answer To The Personal Slanders Published By Dr. Richard Newton, Published for J.J. and P. Knapton [etc.] (London), against Richard Newton, principal of Hart Hall, Oxford, 1735

References 

1692 births
1755 deaths
People educated at Blundell's School
People educated at Exeter School
Bishops of Bristol
Alumni of Exeter College, Oxford
Deans of Christ Church, Oxford
18th-century Church of England bishops
Rectors of Exeter College, Oxford
Clergy from Devon